Arthur Arnold (born in Naarden, 5 April 1967) is a Dutch orchestra conductor.

Arnold studied cello at the Maastricht Academy of Music and the Conservatorium van Amsterdam with Dmitri Ferschtman, and later in London with Christopher Bunting.  He played cello in several orchestras, including Conjuncto Iberico and the Netherlands Philharmonic Orchestra.  He studied conducting with Anton Kersjes at the Maastricht Academy of Music and took private lessons with Marcello Viotti, Jean Fournet and Graeme Jenkins. He attended masterclasses with Jorma Panula in Moscow and Amsterdam, with Myung Whun Chung and  Gianluigi Gelmetti at the Accademia Musicale Chigiana in Siena, Italy, and Diego Masson at the Darlington School of Arts in the UK. Arnold was also an assistant conductor to Hans Vonk.

Arnold was principal guest conductor of the Seoul National Symphony Orchestra from 1997 to 2001.  He first guest-conducted the Moscow Symphony Orchestra in 2001, at the Royal Concertgebouw in Amsterdam.  He subsequently became the orchestra's principal guest conductor, and music director in 2012, until his resignation in March 2022, in response to the war in Ukraine.

Arnold co-founded the Symphony Orchestra Academy of the Pacific (SOAP) in 2004, and served as its music director until the suspension of SOAP in 2012. SOAP subsequently was reorganised into the Pacific Region International Summer Music Association (PRISMA festival & Academy), and Arnold took up its music directorship.  Arnold has premiered several works of Canadian composer Tobin Stokes, including two of his operas, The Vine Dressers and Rattenbury.

The next CD in the series will be Mosolov's Third and Fourth Symphonies.

References

External links 
Arthur Arnold official website
Moscow Symphony Orchestra conductors page
Arnold Pacific Region International Summer Music Academy (PRISMA) page on Arthur Arnold
 'Making music in Moscow and Powell River'.  CBC British Columbia radio programme, 6 May 2014

1967 births
Living people
Dutch conductors (music)
Male conductors (music)
Conservatorium van Amsterdam alumni
People from Naarden
21st-century conductors (music)
21st-century male musicians